Warped Kart Racers is a crossover racing video game developed and published by Electric Square under licensing from 20th Century Games. It is a racing featuring properties from four different shows by 20th Television Animation, namely Family Guy, American Dad!, King of the Hill and Solar Opposites. It was released as an exclusive through Apple Arcade on May 20, 2022.

Gameplay
Warped Kart Racers first gameplay reveal took place in early May 2022 and showcases some frantic racing action.

Development
Warped Kart Racers was announced by Apple on May 3, 2022, with animated characters licensed from four different animated shows by 20th Television Animation. It was released as an exclusive through Apple Arcade on May 20, 2022.

Reception 
Kotaku's Zack Zwiezen noted that although the game was a clear Mario Kart clone, it was also a "fun and well-made mobile kart racer" and that the lack of microtransactions that are present in most mobile games because of the Apple Arcade subscription model compared favorably against Mario Kart Tour. Pocket Tactics's Kayleigh Partleton praised the game and called it a "fantastic mobile kart racer" in a positive review.

References

External links
Warped Kart Racers at the Mac App Store
Warped Kart Racers at Facebook
Warped Kart Racers Facebook group
r/Warped Kart Racer at Reddit
Warped Kart Racers at TouchArcade
Warped Kart Racers at the Crossover Wiki

2022 video games
Kart racing video games
Crossover video games
Crossover racing games
Apple Arcade games
iOS games
macOS games
Video games based on animated television series
Video games developed in the United States
Multiplayer and single-player video games
Family Guy
American Dad!
King of the Hill